From Toshiko With Love is the twelfth recording released by the Toshiko Akiyoshi – Lew Tabackin Big Band (ninth studio recording).  It was released in Japan by  Victor Records and in the U.S. (under the title Tanuki's Night Out) by Jazz America Marketing – not to be confused with the 2002 Lew Tabackin Trio recording of the same name (Tanuki's Night Out).   The album received two Grammy award nominations in 1981 for "Best Jazz Instrumental Performance - Big Band" and "Best Arrangement of an Instrumental Recording" (for the song "A Bit Byas'd").

Track listing
All songs composed by Lew Tabackin and arranged by Toshiko Akiyoshi:
LP side A
"A Bit Byas'd" – 7:29
"Lament for Sonny" – 5:11
"Let the Tape Roll" (aka "Lew's Theme") – 7:30
LP side B
"Tanuki's Night Out" –  7:40
"Falling Petal" – 8:36
"Yet Another Tear" – 2:49
note: Side A and Side B designations are reversed on the JAM Records LP release, Tanuki's Night Out

Personnel
Toshiko Akiyoshi – piano
Lew Tabackin – tenor saxophone and flute
John Gross – tenor saxophone
Dan Higgins – alto saxophone (except on "Let the Tape Roll")
Gary Foster – alto saxophone (on "Let the Tape Roll")
Bob Sheppard – alto saxophone
Bill Byrne – baritone saxophone
Buddy Childers – trumpet
Steve Huffsteter – trumpet
Larry Ford – trumpet  and piccolo trumpet
Mike Price – trumpet  (except on "Let the Tape Roll")
Richard Cooper – trumpet  (on "Let the Tape Roll")
Jim Sawyer – trombone
Hart Smith – trombone
Bruce Fowler – trombone
Phil Teele – bass trombone
Edward Bennett – bass
Steve Haughton – drums

References / External Links
RCA Victor (Japan) Records RVC RJL-8016
JAM (Jazz America Marketing) JAM 006
[ Allmusic]
1981 Grammy nominations, Best Jazz Instrumental Performance - Big Band and (for "A Bit Byas'd") Best Arrangement of an Instrumental Recording (LA Times link)

References

Toshiko Akiyoshi – Lew Tabackin Big Band albums
1981 albums